Petr Ton (born 8 October 1973) is Czech former professional ice hockey winger.

Ton played in the Czech Extraliga for HC Kladno, HC Sparta Praha and HC Kometa Brno. He also played in the Finnish SM-liiga for Jokerit, Blues, JYP and Oulun Kärpät.

Ton won the Czech Extraliga championship in 2006 and 2007 with Sparta Praha. In 2006-07 season Ton played 67 games and scored 36 goals in Czech Extraliga for HC Sparta Praha.

In 2018 he supports WBHF and Masters WBHFC.

Career statistics

Regular season and playoffs

International

References

External links

 
 
 

Czech ice hockey forwards
1973 births
Living people
HC Sparta Praha players
Espoo Blues players
HC Kometa Brno players
Jokerit players
JYP Jyväskylä players
Rytíři Kladno players
Oulun Kärpät players
People from Slaný
Sportspeople from the Central Bohemian Region
Czech expatriate ice hockey players in Finland
Czechoslovak ice hockey forwards